Nigel Morrison (born 5 October 1955 in New Plymouth) is a Vanuatuan cricket umpire. He is yet to make his international debut but he has stood in many ICC tournaments. He was elected to the ICC Associates and Affiliates Umpire Panel in 2015.

References

Sportspeople from New Plymouth
Vanuatuan cricket umpires
1955 births
Living people